Paraíso (Galician, Portuguese, Spanish) means paradise in English. It also may refer to:

Places

Central America 
Paraiso, Belize, a municipality in Belize
Paraíso, Costa Rica
Paraíso (canton), a canton in Cartago province
Paraíso, Barahona, Dominican Republic
Paraíso, Distrito Nacional, Dominican Republic
Paraíso, Tabasco, Tabasco, Mexico
Paraíso, Panamá Province, Panama
Paraíso, Chiriquí, Panama
Paraíso, Los Santos, Panama

South America 
Paraíso, Santa Catarina, Brazil
Paraíso, São Paulo, Brazil
Paraíso (São Paulo Metro)
Paraíso do Tocantins, a municipality in the state of Tocantins in the Northern region of Brazil
El Paraíso, Peru, settlement in the Chillón Valley occupied ca. 3500-1800 BC.

Television
 Paraíso (Venezuelan TV series), a 1989 Venezuelan telenovela
 Paraíso (2000 TV series), a Spanish television series that ran from 2000 to 2003
 Paraíso (2009 TV series), a 2009 Brazilian telenovela
 Paraiso (Philippine TV series), a 2012 Philippine daytime television drama
 Paraíso (2021 TV series), a Spanish television series that ran from 2021 to 2022

Cinema
 Paraíso (1941 film), a Filipino film starring Tita Duran, et al
 Paraíso (1970 film), a 1970 film by Luis Alcoriza
 Paraíso (2003 film), a 2003 film by Alina Teodorescu
 Paraiso, a 2009 film by Leon Ichaso

Music
 "Paraiso" (4th Impact song), a song by 4th Impact, formerly known as The Cercados
 Paraiso (Haruomi Hosono album), a 1978 album by Haruomi Hosono
 "Paraiso" (Marius Yo song), a solo song of Marius Yo from the group Sexy Zone
 "Paraiso" (Smokey Mountain song), on Paraiso (Smokey Mountain album)
 Paraiso (Subsignal album), an album by Subsignal
 "Paraíso", a song by Bloc Party on the album Hymns
 Paraíso (Lucas Lucco song), a 2018 song by Lucas Lucco and Pabllo Vittar

Other uses
 Paraiso (Pugad Baboy story arc),  a story arc of the Philippine comic strip series Pugad Baboy
 In Tomb Raider: Legend, a level set around a small town named Paraíso
 Bala de Cañón (Couroupita nicaraguensis), a species of woody plant also known as paraíso
 Paraíso (Panama Metro), a rapid transit station in Panama City.